Danil Ilgizovich Akhatov (born 22 December 2003) is a Russian football player who plays for FC Ufa.

Club career
He made his debut in the Russian Premier League for FC Ufa on 12 September 2021 in a game against PFC Sochi.

Career statistics

References

External links
 
 
 

2003 births
People from Neftekamsk
Volga Tatars
Tatar people of Russia
Tatar sportspeople
Sportspeople from Bashkortostan
Living people
Russian footballers
Association football forwards
FC Ufa players
Russian Premier League players
Russian First League players